William Joe Carter (July 23, 1909 – December 22, 1991) was an American football end.  He played for 11 seasons in the National Football League (NFL), from 1933 to 1940 for the Philadelphia Eagles, in 1942 for the Green Bay Packers, 1944 for the Brooklyn Tigers, and 1945 for the Chicago Bears.  Carter graduated North Dallas High School and attended West Virginia University (WVU).

Career
A 6'1", 208 pound end, Carter led the NFL in receiving in 1934 and finished sixth in 1937 and third in 1938.

Carter was a charter member of the Eagles when the team entered the NFL in 1933. At the time of his retirement in 1940 at the age of 30 he was last of the original Eagles squad still affiliated with the franchise.

References

1909 births
1991 deaths
People from Dalhart, Texas
Players of American football from Dallas
American football ends
West Virginia Mountaineers football players
Philadelphia Eagles players
Green Bay Packers players
Brooklyn Tigers players
Chicago Bears players